At the 1996 Summer Olympics in Atlanta, four diving events were contested during a competition that took place at the Georgia Tech Aquatic Center, from 26 July to 2 August, comprising a total of 122 divers from 39 nations.

Medal summary

Men

Women

Medal table

Participating nations
Here are listed the nations that were represented in the diving events and, in brackets, the number of national competitors.

See also
 Diving at the 1994 Commonwealth Games
 Diving at the 1995 Pan American Games
 Diving at the 1998 Commonwealth Games

References

Sources
 
 

 
1996 Summer Olympics events
1996
1996 in water sports